Browns Chapel is an unincorporated community in Monongalia County, West Virginia, United States.

References

Unincorporated communities in West Virginia
Unincorporated communities in Monongalia County, West Virginia